Dakini is a 2018 Malayalam-language adventure comedy film directed by Rahul Riji Nair starring Aju Varghese, Pauly Valsan, Sarasa Balussery, Savithri Sreedharan, Sethu Lakshmi, Alencier and Chemban Vinod. It was produced under the banner of Universal Cinema & Urvasi Theatres Release. The movie revolves around four elderly women.

Plot
Four granies namely , Mollykutty, Saroja, Rosemary and Vilasini lives with their helper Jeemon. They learn things like WhatsApp with the help of 
Jeemon.

Kuttan Pilla who was the lover of Mollykutty who left her in their young age comes back. Kuttan Pilla betrays a local don named Mayan in a hawala dealing and escapes with money. Maayan kidnaps Kuttan Pillai.

In the later part these four grandmother's with the help their aid and his friend Vikraman Parudeesa a local gangster helps them.These elderly women call Maayan as Dakini (cartoon character from Mayavi). Later they saves Kuttan Pillai from the hands of Maayan.

Cast
Pauly Valsan as Mollykutty
Sarasa Balussery as Saroja
Savithri Sreedharan as Rosemary
Sethu Lakshmi as Vilasini
Alencier as Kuttan Pillai
Aju Varghese as Jeemon
Chemban Vinod as Maayan
Saiju Kurup as Vikraman Parudeesa 
Indrans as Raju Bhai
Renjit Shekar Nair as Indran
Arjun Ranjan as Kuttan Pillai's Associate
Mamitha Baiju as Arathy

Release
Dakini released on 18 October 2018.

Reception
The Times of India gave the film a rating of 3.5/5
 and Mathrubhumi gave the film a rating of 1.5/5.

References

2018 films
2010s Malayalam-language films
Indian comedy films
2018 comedy films